The 2022–23 EFL Cup was the 63rd season of the EFL Cup (known as the Carabao Cup for sponsorship reasons). The competition was open to all clubs participating in the Premier League and the English Football League.

The winner of the competition qualified for the play-off round of the 2023–24 UEFA Europa Conference League.

Liverpool were the defending champions, having beaten Chelsea on penalties to secure a record 9th title in the previous season's final, but were eliminated by Manchester City in the fourth round.

The final was played at Wembley Stadium on 26 February 2023 between Manchester United and Newcastle United, with Manchester United winning 2–0 for their sixth title.

Access
All 92 clubs in the Premier League and English Football League entered the season's EFL Cup. Access was distributed across the top 4 leagues of the English football league system.

In the first round, 22 of 24 Championship clubs, and all League One and League Two clubs entered.

The following round, the two remaining Championship clubs, who finished 18th and 19th in the 2021–22 Premier League season (Burnley and Watford), and the Premier League clubs not involved in either the Champions League, Europa League or Europa Conference League entered.

First round
A total of 70 clubs played in the first round: 24 from League Two (tier 4), 24 from League One (tier 3), and 22 from the Championship (tier 2). The draw for this round was split on a geographical basis into "northern" and "southern" sections. Teams were drawn against a team from the same section.

Northern section

Southern section

Second round
A total of 50 clubs played in the second round: the 35 winners from the first round, the 2 clubs from the Championship (tier 2) who did not enter in the first round, plus the 13 Premier League clubs who were not in European competition. The draw for this round was split on a geographical basis into "northern" and "southern" sections. Teams were drawn against a team from the same section.

Northern section

Southern section

Third round
A total of 32 teams played in the third round. Arsenal, Chelsea, Liverpool, Manchester City, Manchester United, Tottenham Hotspur, and West Ham United entered in this round due to their participation in either the 2022–23 UEFA Champions League, the 2022–23 UEFA Europa League, and the 2022–23 UEFA Europa Conference League. The draw was made on 24 August 2022. The third round consisted of 19 clubs from the Premier League, three from the Championship, six from League One and four from League Two.  Ties were scheduled to be played in the week commencing 7 November 2022.

Fourth round
A total of 16 teams played in the fourth round. League Two side Gillingham was the lowest-ranked team in the draw, which was made on 10 November 2022.

Quarter-finals
A total of eight teams played in the quarter-finals. League One side Charlton Athletic was the lowest-ranked team in the draw and the only non-Premier League team left.

Semi-finals
A total of four teams, all of them from the Premier League, played in this round.

Summary

|}

Manchester United won 5–0 on aggregate.

Newcastle United won 3–1 on aggregate.

Final

Top goalscorers

Notes

References

EFL Cup seasons
EFL Cup Final